A Master of Science in Data Science is an interdisciplinary degree program designed to provide studies in scientific methods, processes, and systems to extract knowledge or insights from data in various forms, either structured or unstructured, similar to data mining.

Overview
As an area of expertise and field, data science is defined as a "concept to unify statistics, data analysis and their related methods" in order to "understand and analyze actual phenomena" with data. It employs techniques and theories drawn from many fields within the broad areas of mathematics, statistics, information science, and computer science, in particular from the subdomains of machine learning, statistical classification, cluster analysis, data mining, databases, and visualization.

The degree is relatively new, with graduate schools, business schools, and data science centers often housing the programs. Data science degree programs have emerged to address the growing and unique need for data scientists who can provide insight into multiple organizational issues and interests across several disciplines.

When Harvard Business Review called data scientist "The Sexiest Job of the 21st Century" the term became a buzzword, and is now often applied to business analytics, or even arbitrary use of data, or used as a term for statistics. While many university programs now offer a data science degree, there exists no consensus on a definition or curriculum contents.

Data scientist was listed as the "Best Job in America" for both 2016 and 2017 by employment website Glassdoor. It was also listed by Forbes as the top job for work–life balance.

Some degree programs focus squarely on the science of data analysis and statistics (mathematical, statistical, computational and programming skills) and allow for exploration of electives focused on special areas of interest, such as Stanford University’s MS in Data Science. Some degree programs can be found within an institution’s school of Engineering, Computer Science or Statistics department. Other institutions may take an interdisciplinary approach to the degree, bringing a pairing of data science and a specific application, e.g., Biostatistics, Cybersecurity or Marketing, such as the University of Connecticut’s Master of Science in Data Science or Columbia University's Data Science Institute.

Master in Data Science programs

Australia 
James Cook University
Macquarie University
Monash University
Queensland University of Technology
University of Melbourne
University of New England (Australia)
University of New South Wales
University of Newcastle (Australia)
University of Queensland
University of Sydney
University of Technology Sydney
University of Western Australia
Western Sydney University

United States 
 Boston University
 Brown University
 Cabrini University
 Carnegie Mellon University
 City University of Seattle
 Columbia University
 Cornell University
 Duke University
 Drexel University
 Harvard University
 Illinois Institute of Technology
 Indiana University, Bloomington
 Johns Hopkins University
 Lewis University
 Merrimack College
 National University, California
 New Jersey Institute of Technology
 New York University
 North Carolina State University
 Northwestern University
 Rutgers University
 Saint Peter's University
 Southern Methodist University
 Stanford University
 Syracuse University
 Tufts University
 University of California, Berkeley
 University of California, San Diego
 University of Colorado Boulder
 University of Connecticut
 University of Illinois Urbana–Champaign
 University of Michigan
 University of Minnesota - Twin Cities
 University of St. Thomas
 University of Pennsylvania
 University of Rochester
 University of Southern California
 University of Virginia
 University of Wisconsin
 Utica College

Canada 
 McGill University
 Ryerson University
 University of Alberta
 University of British Columbia
 University of Calgary
 University of the Fraser Valley

United Kingdom 
 City University London
 Coventry University
 De Montfort University
 Goldsmiths, University of London
 Imperial College London
 Newcastle University
 Robert Gordon University
 Royal Holloway, University of London
 University College London
 University of Bristol
 University of Dundee
 University of East Anglia
 University of East London
 University of Essex
 University of Greenwich
 University of Liverpool
 University of Manchester
 University of St. Andrews
 University of Warwick

Ireland 
 Dublin Institute of Technology
 Institute of Technology Blanchardstown
 University College Cork
 It Carlow

Germany 
 Frankfurt School of Finance & Management
RWTH Aachen University
Friedrich–Alexander University Erlangen–Nürnberg (FAU)

France 
 Télécom Paris Tech
 Télécom SudParis
 ESSEC Business School

Denmark 
 Aalborg University

Mexico 
Universidad Tecnológica Latinoamericana

New Zealand 
University of Auckland
University of Canterbury
University of Otago

Hong Kong 
City University of Hong Kong
Chinese University of Hong Kong
University of Hong Kong

References 

Data Science, Master in